Marek Antoni Kolbowicz (born 11 June 1971 in Szczecin) is a Polish rower. He won a gold medal in quadruple sculls at the 2008 Summer Olympics and was world champion in 2005, 2006 and 2007.

For his sport achievements, he received: 
 Knight's Cross of the Order of Polonia Restituta (5th Class) in 2008.

References

External links
 Photo
 

1971 births
Living people
Sportspeople from Szczecin
Polish male rowers
Olympic rowers of Poland
Olympic gold medalists for Poland
Rowers at the 1996 Summer Olympics
Rowers at the 2000 Summer Olympics
Rowers at the 2004 Summer Olympics
Rowers at the 2008 Summer Olympics
Rowers at the 2012 Summer Olympics
Olympic medalists in rowing
Medalists at the 2008 Summer Olympics
World Rowing Championships medalists for Poland
European Rowing Championships medalists